NH 115 may refer to:

 National Highway 115 (India)
 New Hampshire Route 115, United States